The Man from Dakota is a 1940 American Civil War film directed by Leslie Fenton and starring Wallace Beery and Dolores del Río. The film was adapted by Laurence Stallings from the novel Arouse and Beware by MacKinlay Kantor.

Francis Ford makes an unbilled appearance as a horseman on a bridge and Buddy Roosevelt also appears in an uncredited role, usually referred to as "Officer #1."

Cast

Wallace Beery as Bar Barstow
John Howard as Oliver Clark
Dolores del Río as Jenny Sanford
Donald Meek as Mr. Vestry
Robert Barrat as Parson Summers
Addison Richards as Confederate Provost Marshal

External links

1940 films
American black-and-white films
Films set in the 19th century
Films directed by Leslie Fenton
Metro-Goldwyn-Mayer films
Films based on American novels
1940 Western (genre) films
American Western (genre) films
Films based on works by MacKinlay Kantor
Films scored by Daniele Amfitheatrof
1940 drama films
1940s English-language films
1940s American films